A dry port (sometimes referred to as an inland port) is an inland intermodal terminal directly connected by road or rail to a seaport, operating as a centre for the transshipment of sea cargo to inland destinations.

In addition to their role in cargo transshipment, dry ports may also include facilities for storage and consolidation of goods, maintenance for road or rail cargo carriers and customs clearance services. The location of these facilities at a dry port relieves competition for storage and customs space at the seaport itself.

A dry inland port can speed up the flow of cargo between ships and major land transportation networks, creating a more central distribution point. Inland ports can improve the movement of imports and exports, moving the time-consuming sorting and processing of containers inland, away from congested seaports.

Background
The term inland port is used in a narrow sense in the field of transportation systems to mean a specialized facility for intermodal containers (standardized shipping container) in international transport. Rather than goods being loaded and unloaded in such ports, shipping containers can just be transferred between ship and road vehicle or ship and train. The container may be transferred again between road and rail elsewhere and the goods are only loaded or unloaded at their point of origin or final destination.

Shipping containers allow some functions traditionally carried out at a seaport to be moved elsewhere. Examples are the functions of receiving, processing through customs, inspecting, sorting, and consolidating containers going to the same overseas port. Container transfer at the seaport can be sped up and container handling space can be reduced by transferring functions to an inland site away from the port and coast.

Distribution can also be made more efficient by setting up a link between the inland site and seaport as, say, a high-capacity rail link with a lower unit cost than sending containers individually by road. The containers are still collected from their origins or distributed to their ultimate destinations by road with the transfer happening at the inland site.

An inland port is just such an inland site linked to a seaport. This kind of inland port does not require a waterway. Key features of an inland port are the transfer of containers between different modes of transportation (intermodal transfer) and the processing of international trade. This differentiates an inland port from a container depot or transport hub.

The term inland port may also be used for a similar model of a site linked to an airport or land border crossing rather than a seaport.

The definition of inland port in the jargon of the transportation and logistics industries is:

An inland port is a physical site located away from traditional land, air and coastal borders with the vision to facilitate and process international trade through strategic investment in multi-modal transportation assets and by promoting value-added services as goods move through the supply chain.

Inland ports may also be referred to as dry ports or intermodal hubs.

Dry ports in Africa 
  : October dry port, 6th of October, Giza Governorate, Egypt.
  : Borg El Arab dry port, New Borg El Arab, Alexandria Governorate, Egypt.
  : Algiers, Algeria 
  : Oran, Algeria (two dry ports, CMA CGM and MTA)
  : Viana, Angola
  : Parakou, Benin
  : Kasumbalesa Inland Port, Kasumbalesa, Democratic Republic of the Congo
  : Matsapha Dry Port, Manzini, Eswatini
  : Dire Dawa, Ethiopia
  : Mekelle, Ethiopia
  : Modjo, Ethiopia
  : Semera, Ethiopia
  : Boankra Inland Port, Kumasi, Ghana
  : Eldoret Inland Port, Eldoret, Kenya
  : Inland Container Depot Embakasi (ICDE), Embakasi, Nairobi, Kenya
  : Inland Container Depot Kisumu, Kisumu, Kenya
  : Inland Container Depot Naivasha, Naivasha, Kenya
  : Inland Container Depot Aba, IsialaNgwa, Aba, Abia State, Nigeria
  : Inland Container Depot Ibadan, Erunmu, Ibadan, Oyo State, Nigeria
  : Inland Container Depot Kano, Zawachiki, Kano State, Nigeria
  : Heipang Inland Container Depot, Heipang, Jos, Plateau State, Nigeria
  : Funtua Inland Container Float Station, Zamfarawa, Funtua, Katsina State, Nigeria
  : Maiduguri Inland Container Float Station, Jauri, Maiduguri, Borno State, Nigeria
  : Kaduna Inland Container Depot, Kaduna, Kaduna State, Nigeria
  : Masaka Inland Container Depot, Masaka, Kigali, Rwanda.
  : City Deep Inland Container Depot, Johannesburg, Gauteng, South Africa
  : Cape Town Bellville Inland Container Terminal, Bellville, Western Cape, South Africa
  : Deal Party Inland Container Terminal, Deal Party, Gqeberha, Eastern Cape Province, South Africa
  : Pretcon Inland Container Terminal, Pretoria, Gauteng, South Africa
  : Bayhead Inland Container Terminal, Bayhead, KwaZulu-Natal, South Africa
  : Komatipoort Dry Port, Nkomazi, Mpumalanga, South Africa
  : Bloemfontein Inland Container Terminal, Bloemfontein, Free State, South Africa
  : Isaka Inland Container Depot, Isaka, Kahama Rural District, Shinyanga Region, Tanzania
  : Cinkasse Dry Port, Cinkassé, Togo
  : Nakawa Inland Port, Nakawa, Kampala, Uganda
  : Tororo Inland Port, Tororo, Uganda
  : Chipata Inland Port, Chipata, Chipata District, Eastern Province, Zambia
  : Mutare Dry Port, Mutare, Zimbabwe

Dry ports in Asia 

  : Abresham Inland Port, Zaranj, Afghanistan
  : Abu Nasir Inland Port, Shib Koh District, Farah Province, Afghanistan
  : Hairatan Inland Port, Hairatan, Afghanistan
  : Islam Qala Inland Port, Islam Qala, Afghanistan
  : Sher Khan Inland Port, Sher Khan, Afghanistan
  : Spin Boldak Inland Port, Spin Boldak, Afghanistan
  : Torghundi Inland Port, Torghundi, Afghanistan
  : Torkham Inland Port, Torkham, Afghanistan
  :Union Import, Export & Transportation and Dry Port, Phnom Penh, Cambodia
 / : Khorgas Inland Port, Khorgas, China (the dry port is 65% Chinese, 35% Kazakh)
  : Inland Container Depot, Garhi Harsaru (Gurugram), Haryana, India
  : Inland Container Depot, Faridabad, Haryana, India
  : Inland Container Depot, Sahnewal, Ludhiana, Punjab, India
  : Inland Container Depot, Viramgam, Gujarat, India
  : Durgapur Inland Dry Port, Durgapur, West Bengal, India
  : Inland Container Depot, Whitefield, Bangalore, India
  : Inland Container Depot, Tughlakabad, New Delhi, India
  : Inland Container Depot, Hyderabad, Hyderabad, India
  : Kanpur Dry Port, Kanpur, India
  : Vallarpadam Dry Port, Kochi, India
  : Wardha Dry Port, Maharashtra, India
  : Jalna Dry Port, Maharashtra, India
  : Cikarang Dry Port, West Java, Indonesia
  : Sungai Duku Port, (Pekan Baru), Indonesia
  : Waru Dry Port, East Java, Indonesia
  : Birgunj Inland Dry Port, Sirsiya (Birganj), Nepal
  : Bhairahwa Inland Dry Port, Siddharthanagar, Nepal
  : Biratnagar Inland Dry Port, Biratnagar, Nepal
  : Nepalgunj Inland Dry Port, Nepalgunj, Nepal
  : Kathmandu Inland Dry Port, Kathmandu, Nepal
  : Faisalabad Inlnd Port, Faisalabad, Pakistan
  : Hyderabad Dry Port, Hyderabad, Pakistan
  : Lahore Dry Port, Lahore, Pakistan
  : Larkana Dry Port, Larkana, Pakistan
  : Multan Dry Port, Multan, Pakistan
  : Sialkot Dry Port, Sialkot, Pakistan
  : Riyadh Dry Port, Riyadh, Saudi Arabia
  : Aitken Spence Mabole Dry Port, Sri Lanka

Dry ports in Europe 
  : Dry Port Muizen, Belgium
  : Togher Inland Port, Portlaoise, Ireland
  : Vilnius Intermodal Terminal, Lithuania
  : Kaunas Intermodal Terminal, Lithuania
  : Dry Port Azuqueca de Henares, Spain
  : Dry Port Madrid in Coslada, Spain
  : Dry Port Santander-Ebro, Spain 
  : Nässjö Dry Port, Sweden
  : Eskilstuna Dry Port, Sweden
  : Dry Port Hallsberg, Sweden

Dry ports in North America 

  : CentrePort Canada, Winnipeg, Manitoba, Canada
  : Global Transportation Hub, Regina, Saskatchewan, Canada
  : Port Alberta, Edmonton, Alberta, Canada
  : Ashcroft Terminal, Ashcroft, British Columbia, Canada
  : Guanajuato Inland Port,  Silao, Guanajuato, Mexico
  : CenterPoint Intermodal Center, Elwood, Illinois, United States
  : Port of Memphis, Memphis, Tennessee, United States
  : Port of Tucson, Tucson, Arizona, United States
  : Port San Antonio, San Antonio, Texas, United States
  : Greer Inland Port, Greer, South Carolina, United States
  : Virginia Inland Port, Front Royal, Virginia, United States
  : Charlotte Inland Terminal,  Charlotte, North Carolina, United States
  : Piedmont Triad Inland Terminal, Greensboro, North Carolina, United States
  : Martinsburg Inland Port, Martinsburg, West Virginia, United States

Dry ports in Oceania
  : Alice Springs Intermodal Terminal, Alice Springs, Northern Territory, Australia
  : Altona Inland Port, Altona, Victoria, Australia
  : Brighton Transport Hub, Hobart, Tasmania, Australia
  : Penfield Intermodal Freight Centre, Penfield, South Australia, Australia
  : Wimmera Intermodal Freight Terminal, Dooen, Victoria, Australia
  : Ettamogah Rail Hub, Albury, New South Wales, Australia
  : Kewdale Freight Terminal, Kewdale, Western Australia, Australia
  : Moorebank Intermodal Terminal, Moorebank, New South Wales, Australia (Inland Port for Port Botany)
  : Minto Inland Port, Minto, New South Wales, Australia (Connected by rail to Port Botany)
  : Riverina Intermodal Freight & Logistics Hub, Bomen, New South Wales, Australia
  : Shepparton Intermodal Terminal, Shepparton, Victoria, Australia
  : Somerton Multi-Modal Freight Terminal, Somerton, Victoria, Australia
  : Warrnambool Intermodal Terminal, Warrnambool, Victoria, Australia
  : Wiri Inland Port, Auckland, New Zealand
  : Metroport Inland Port, Onehunga, Auckland, New Zealand (A division of Port of Tauranga)
  : Ruakura Inland Port, Hamilton, New Zealand
  : MidlandPort at Rolleston, Christchurch, New Zealand

Dry ports in South America 
  : Porto Seco Centro Oeste Dry Port, Brasilia (Federal District), Brazil
  : Los Andes Dry Port, Los Andes, Chile
  : APM Terminals Uruguay, Montevideo, Uruguay

See also 
 Inland port
 Intergovernmental Agreement on Dry Ports
 Intermodal freight transport

References